was a Japanese businessman and central banker.  He was the 17th and 19th Governor of the Bank of Japan (BOJ).

Early life
Araki was born in Ishikawa Prefecture.

Career
Araki was Governor of the Bank of Japan from October 9, 1945 to June 1, 1946 and again from December 11, 1954 to November 30, 1956. He also served as the Japanese Ambassador to the United States from 1952 until 1953.

Notes

References
Werner, Richard A. (2003). Princes of the Yen: Japan's Central Bankers and the Transformation of the Economy. Armonk, New York: M.E. Sharpe. ;  OCLC 471605161

|-

|-

|-

1891 births
1959 deaths
Governors of the Bank of Japan
People from Ishikawa Prefecture